Mary Sue Radford is a Canadian curler. She currently plays third on Team Theresa Breen.

She was the alternate on the  Colleen Jones rink.

Teams

References

External links

Mary Sue Radford - Curling Canada Stats Archive
Mary Sue Radford | Curling Canada

Living people
Sportspeople from Halifax, Nova Scotia
Canadian women curlers
Curlers from Nova Scotia
World curling champions
Canadian women's curling champions
Year of birth missing (living people)